Kintbury Lock is a lock on the Kennet and Avon Canal, at Kintbury, Berkshire, England.

See also

List of locks on the Kennet and Avon Canal

References

Locks on the Kennet and Avon Canal
Locks of Berkshire
1723 establishments in England
Buildings and structures completed in 1723
Kintbury